The Rooney family is an Irish-American family known for its connections to the sports, acting, and political fields. After emigrating from Ireland in the 1840s, it established its American roots in Pittsburgh, Pennsylvania in the 1880s.

The Rooneys are primarily known for having been the majority owners and operators of the Pittsburgh Steelers of the National Football League (NFL) since the formation of the franchise in 1933. Art Rooney was the founder and owner of the team until his death in 1988. Following his death, ownership of the franchise transferred to his oldest son, Dan Rooney, a former United States Ambassador to Ireland. Front office operations have passed from Dan Rooney to his son and current team president, Art Rooney II, in 2017 upon the death of Dan Rooney.

The family members who have had the most influence in the Steelers organization are:
 Art Rooney: team Founder
 Dan Rooney: former team Chairman
 Art Rooney, Jr.: current Vice President and former Personnel Director
 Art Rooney II: current team President

Steelers ownership
The Rooneys have been credited for much of the team's success. The fundamental approach of the Rooneys to managing the franchise has largely been through patience and consistency, both of which the ownership is renowned for. An example of the team's stability is that there have been only three head coaches employed since 1969, the fewest for any team in American professional sports during that time frame. This approach has proven to be rewarding, given that the Steelers have won six Super Bowls in the post AFL–NFL merger era – with all three coaches (Chuck Noll, Bill Cowher, and Mike Tomlin) having won at least one Super Bowl and two AFC championships apiece – and the team being a playoff contender in most years.

Dan Rooney's influence as chairman of the league's diversity committee made it a requirement for any team seeking a new head coach to include an interview with at least one ethnic minority candidate during that process. For this reason, the practice has become known as the "Rooney Rule".

Mara connection
The Rooneys are also related to the Mara family, part-owners and founders of the New York Giants. The Mara family name used to be O'Mara and their Rooney family ancestors originate in Newry, County Down.

Actresses Kate Mara and Rooney Mara are the daughters of Timothy Christopher Mara, the vice president of player evaluation for the New York Giants, and Kathleen McNulty (née Rooney). Their paternal grandfather, Wellington Mara, was the long-time co-owner of the Giants, succeeded by their uncle, John Mara. Their maternal grandfather, Timothy James "Tim" Rooney, has run Yonkers Raceway in Yonkers, New York since 1972. The Mara sisters are the great-granddaughters of both New York Giants founder Tim Mara and Pittsburgh Steelers founder Art Rooney.

Notable family members

Ownership restructuring
In July 2008 the Rooney family went public with the plan to reorganize the ownership structure of the franchise. Each of the five Rooney brothers owns 16% of the team, combining for 80%, while another related family, the McGinleys, own 20%. Dan Rooney, chairman, stated that his four brothers are moving towards other non-football-related business ventures and he is in talks with them to buy out their shares. However, the other four brothers believe Dan undervalued their shares, and hired Goldman Sachs to give them an estimate on the team. The estimate by Goldman Sachs valued the team between $800 million and $1.2 billion. One potential buyer has been identified, Stanley Druckenmiller, the Pittsburgh billionaire who is the chairman of Duquesne Capital Management and a former money manager for George Soros. Talks to restructure the ownership continued for two years to comply with NFL ownership policies and ensure ownership and operation under the Rooney family. The four brothers' ventures with family race tracks that allow slot machines violate NFL rules of ownership with revenue from gambling enterprises. The ownership structure also violated the NFL rule stating that at least one individual must own 30% of the team to be principal owner, and no individual owns at least 30% of the team.  The team did not expect the negotiations to have any effect on the players or fans.

NFL owners unanimously approved the restructuring of ownership on December 17, 2008 after Dan & Art II obtained the mandated 30% stake via negotiations. Timothy and Patrick Rooney sold their shares outright. Art Jr. John Rooney reduced their shares from 16% to 6%, and the McGinley family reduced their shares from 20% to 10%. Also coming on as partners were Pilot Corporation & Pilot Travel Centers president Jim Haslam III (who would later relinquish his stake upon purchasing the rival Cleveland Browns), Legendary Pictures president & CEO Thomas Tull, and the Paul Family of Pittsburgh, an influential Pittsburgh family (Ampco-Pittsburgh Corp., serves on numerous boards, including University of Pittsburgh Medical Center and University of Pittsburgh), each getting a 16% stake in the team. Dan Rooney mentioned he has no ill will towards Druckenmiller, mentioning he's a great Steelers fan and wishes he remains one.

The Steelers later announced on March 23, 2009, that they added three more investors to the team, the most notable of which is Hall of Fame wide receiver John Stallworth. The other two investors added were GTCR chairman Bruce V. Rauner and the Varischetti Family of Brockway, Pennsylvania, which owns several nursing homes and a commercial real estate business. The deal to add all six new investors was finalized in May 2009.

Awards and honors

Sports
 Six-time Super Bowl winners (as owners of the Pittsburgh Steelers)
 Two-time Pro Football Hall of Fame inductees
 Art – class of 1964
 Dan – class of 2000
 2006: Outstanding Team ESPY Award (as owners of the Super Bowl XL winning Steelers)
 1978: NFL Alumni Order of the Leather Helmet Award – Art
 Art Rooney Avenue in Pittsburgh named in Art's honor
 Statue in front of Heinz Field – Art
 Duquesne University football stadium named Arthur J. Rooney Athletic Field
 2009: Jack Horrigan Memorial Award – Dan (Professional Football Writers of America)
 2014: Sports Business Journal Lifetime Achievement Award – Dan (for establishing the Rooney Rule)

Military
 Honorary CBE – Dan
 Two-time Army Commendation Medal recipient – Tom

Acting
 2015: Cannes Film Festival Award for Best Actress – Rooney Mara (shared with Emmanuelle Bercot)

Political offices held
 U.S. Ambassador to Ireland – Dan (2009–2012)
 U.S. Representative – Tom (2009–2019)
 Florida State Representative – Patrick Jr. (2010–2016)

References

 
Pittsburgh Steelers owners